The 2008 congressional elections in Georgia were held on November 4, 2008, to determine who would represent the state of Georgia in the United States House of Representatives, coinciding with the presidential and senatorial elections. Representatives are elected for two-year terms; those elected will serve in the 111th Congress from January 3, 2009, until January 3, 2011.

Georgia has thirteen seats in the House, apportioned according to the 2000 United States Census. Its 2007–2008 congressional delegation consisted of seven Republicans and six Democrats. No districts changed party, although CQ Politics had forecasted districts 8 and 12 to be at some risk for the incumbent party.

The general primary was held July 15, 2008.

Overview 

All information came from the Secretary of State of Georgia website.

Match-up summary

District breakdown

District 1

Incumbent Republican Jack Kingston (campaign website) won against Democratic nominee Bill Gillespie (campaign website). CQ Politics forecasted the race as 'Safe Republican'.
Race ranking and details from CQ Politics
Campaign contributions from OpenSecrets

District 2

Democratic incumbent Sanford Bishop (campaign website) won against Republican nominee Lee Ferrell (campaign website). CQ Politics forecasted the race as 'Safe Democrat'.
Race ranking and details from CQ Politics
Campaign contributions from OpenSecrets

District 3

Republican incumbent Lynn Westmoreland (campaign website) won against Democratic nominee Stephen Camp (campaign website). CQ Politics forecasted the race as 'Safe Republican'.
Race ranking and details from CQ Politics
Campaign contributions from OpenSecrets

District 4

Freshman Democratic incumbent Hank Johnson (campaign website) was unopposed on the ballot and easily defeated three write-in challengers. CQ Politics forecasted the race as 'Safe Democrat'.
Race ranking and details from CQ Politics 
Campaign contributions from OpenSecrets

District 5

Democratic incumbent John Lewis (campaign website) ran unopposed. CQ Politics forecasted the race as 'Safe Democrat'.
Race ranking and details from CQ Politics
Campaign contributions from OpenSecrets

District 6

Republican incumbent Tom Price (campaign website) won against Democratic nominee Bill Jones (campaign website), an Air Force veteran and high-tech businessman. CQ Politics forecasted the race as 'Safe Republican'.
Race ranking and details from CQ Politics
Campaign contributions from OpenSecrets

District 7

Republican incumbent John Linder (campaign website) won against Democratic nominee Doug Heckman (campaign website), a veteran of the wars in Afghanistan and  Iraq. CQ Politics forecasted the race as 'Safe Republican'.
Race ranking and details from CQ Politics
Campaign contributions from OpenSecrets

District 8

Democratic incumbent Jim Marshall (campaign website) won against Republican nominee and retired Major General Rick Goddard (campaign website). 

Marshall survived a challenge from former Republican congressman Mac Collins in 2006 by 1,752 votes and was expected to face a tough re-election bid in 2008. Some thought this might prompt him to challenge U.S. Senator Saxby Chambliss in Georgia's Senate race, but he decided to stay in the House. Marshall won easily in the primary against music teacher Robert Nowak (campaign website). 

On the Republican side, retired Air Force Major General Rick Goddard announced that he would run. His background may have great appeal in a district with a large number of veterans, though Marshall's own military background and well-established credibility on military issues may cancel this out. Other potential Republican candidates were state Senator Ross Tolleson, state Senator Cecil Staton and former congressman Mac Collins, but Goddard ran unopposed.

The present district, which was implemented starting with the 2006 election, would have given George W. Bush 61% of the vote in 2004 (CPVI=R+8).
Race ranking and details from CQ Politics
Campaign contributions from OpenSecrets

District 9

Republican incumbent Nathan Deal won against Democratic nominee Jeff Scott (campaign website). CQ Politics forecasted the race as 'Safe Republican'.
Race ranking and details from CQ Politics
Campaign contributions from OpenSecrets

District 10

Republican incumbent Paul Broun (campaign website) won against Democratic nominee and Iraq War veteran Bobby Saxon (campaign website). CQ Politics forecasted the race as 'Safe Republican'.

In a 2007 special election, physician Paul Broun, a Republican with libertarian views, won a stunning upset in a non-partisan runoff. On July 15, Broun fended off his Republican primary challenger and state Representative Barry Fleming 71.0% to 29.0%.
Race ranking and details from CQ Politics 
Campaign contributions from OpenSecrets

District 11

Republican incumbent Phil Gingrey (campaign website) won against Democratic nominee Bud Gammon (campaign website). CQ Politics forecasted the race as 'Safe Republican'.
Race ranking and details from CQ Politics
Campaign contributions from OpenSecrets

District 12

Democratic incumbent John Barrow (campaign website) won against Republican John Stone (campaign website). CQ Politics forecasted the race as 'Democrat Favored'.

Barrow won against State Senator Regina D. Thomas in the Democratic primary. In 2006, John Barrow won by only 864 votes against the Republican nominee, former Representative Max Burns. Barrow had defeated then-incumbent Burns in 2004 with 52% of the vote, but in 2007 Burns accepted a job with North Georgia College and State University.

On the Republican side, radio announcer and former congressional aide John Stone won against mechanical engineer and former presidential candidate Ray McKinney and Ben Crystal.

The present district, which was implemented starting with the 2006 election, would have given John Kerry 51% in 2004 (CPVI=D+2). 
Race ranking and details from CQ Politics
Campaign contributions from OpenSecrets

District 13

Democratic incumbent David Scott (campaign website) won against Republican nominee Deborah Honeycutt (campaign website), who also ran unsuccessfully in 2006. CQ Politics forecasted the race as 'Democrat Favored'.
Scott won against Donzella James in the Democratic primary election.
Race ranking and details from CQ Politics
Campaign contributions from OpenSecrets

See also

 2008 United States House of Representatives elections

References

External links
Elections Division from the Georgia Secretary of State
U.S. Congress candidates for Georgia at Project Vote Smart
Georgia U.S. House Races from 2008 Race Tracker
Campaign contributions for Georgia congressional races from OpenSecrets
Candidates from the Democratic Party of Georgia

2008
Georgia
United States House of Representatives